Angst is an intense feeling of internal emotional strife.

Angst may also refer to:

Films
 Angst (1928 film), a British-German film
 Fear (1954 film), a Roberto Rossellini film based on the Zweig novella, known as Angst or Fear in English
 Angst (1976 film), a Norwegian film
 Angst (1983 film), an Austrian film
 Angst (2000 film), an Australian film
 Angst (2003 film), a German film

Music
 Angst (band), an American punk rock band
 Angst (KMFDM album), 1993 album by KMFDM
 Angst (Lacrimosa album), 1991 album by Lacrimosa
 Angst, självdestruktivitetens emissarie, a 2002 album by Shining
 Angst (soundtrack), a 1984 Klaus Schulze album and soundtrack of 1983 film
 "Angst" (Loredana song), 2020
 "Angst" (Rammstein song), 2022

In print
 Fear (Zweig novella), a 1925 Austrian novella with the original title Angst
 Angst (novel), by Oleg Postnov

Other uses
 Angst (surname), a list of people